Mr. America is a 4-track EP by Australian singer Russell Morris, released on 2 March 1972. It includes two singles and two B-sides that were not included on his debut studio album, Bloodstone in 1971.

Track listing

References

Russell Morris albums
1972 EPs
Columbia Records EPs